Geoffrey Bainbridge Evans (1934–2015) was Archdeacon of the Aegean from 1978 to 1994.

Evans was educated at St. Michael's College, Llandaff; and ordained in 1959. After a curacy in Llandaff and Armley  he served in Guyana, İzmir, Bornova and Ankara.

He died on 4 April 2015.

Notes

Alumni of St Michael's College, Llandaff
Archdeacons of the Agean 
20th-century Welsh Anglican priests
1934 births
2015 deaths